Francis Lake is located southeast of Number Four, New York. Fish species present in the lake are pickerel, yellow perch, and black bullhead. There is carry down on Number Four Road, off Route 26.

References

Lakes of New York (state)
Lakes of Lewis County, New York